Erwin Vervecken (born 23 March 1972) is a former Belgian professional cyclist specialising in cyclo-cross. Vervecken was professional cyclists for 16 seasons (1995–2010) and works since his retirement as an external sportive consultant for sportmarketing company Golazo where he helps organizing cyclocross and mountainbike races and does the coordination of the UCI Gran Fondo World Series.  He's also writing for the cycling magazine cycling.be

Career highlights
He won the UCI Cyclo-cross World Championship in 2001, 2006, and 2007.  In 1998, 1999 and 2005 he was second in the World Championships and in 1994 and 2002 he was third in the World Championships.

Major results

1990–1991
 1st  National Junior Championships
1993–1994
 Superprestige
2nd Gieten
 3rd  UCI World Championships
1994–1995
 Superprestige
3rd Gavere
1995–1996
 1st  National Championships
 Superprestige
1st Gieten
1996–1997
 1st Berlin
 UCI World Cup
2nd Koksijde
 Superprestige
3rd Gavere
3rd Plzeň
1997–1998
 2nd National Championships
 2nd  UCI World Championships
 Superprestige
2nd Gavere
1998–1999
 Superprestige
1st Overijse
2nd Hoogstraten
 2nd  UCI World Championships
1999–2000
 2nd National Championships
 Gazet van Antwerpen
3rd Niel
2000–2001
 1st  UCI World Championships
 1st Overall Gazet van Antwerpen
1st Niel
1st Rijkevorsel
2nd Oostmalle
3rd Essen
3rd Lille
 2nd National Championships
 3rd Overall Superprestige
1st Overijse
2nd Diegem
3rd Gavere
 UCI World Cup
2nd Leudelange
 3rd Loenhout
2001–2002
 1st Overall Gazet van Antwerpen
1st Loenhout
2nd Kalmthout
2nd Niel
2nd Lille
3rd Essen
 UCI World Cup
1st Nommay
3rd Igorre
3rd Wetzikon
 1st Hoogerheide
 1st Huijbergen
 2nd Overall Superprestige
1st Sint-Michielsgestel
1st Hoogstraten
1st Diegem
2nd Harnes
3rd Ruddervoorde
 2nd National Championships
 2nd Ardooie
 2nd Berlin
 2nd Contern
 2nd Harderwijk
 2nd Koksijde
 2nd Tábor
 3rd Hofstade
 3rd Overijse
 3rd Oudenaarde
 3rd Woerden
2002–2003
 1st Ardooie
 2nd Asteasu
 2nd Berlin
 3rd Overall Superprestige
3rd Vorselaar
3rd Ruddervoorde
 3rd  UCI World Championships
 3rd Koksijde
2003–2004
 2nd Hofstade
 3rd Overall Superprestige
1st Hoogstraten
2nd Gavere
3rd Diegem
3rd Vorselaar
 3rd Overall UCI World Cup
3rd Koksijde
3rd Nommay
3rd Pijnacker
 3rd Berlin
2004–2005
 Superprestige
1st Hoogstraten
1st Diegem
3rd Gavere
 2nd  UCI World Championships
 2nd Overijse
 2nd Kalmthout
 2nd Woerden
 3rd Overall UCI World Cup
1st Koksijde
2nd Hofstade
3rd Tábor
3rd Wetzikon
3rd Aigle
 3rd Overall Gazet van Antwerpen
2nd Niel
3rd Loenhout
 3rd Hooglede-Gits
 3rd Huijbergen
2005–2006
 1st  UCI World Championships
 UCI World Cup
1st Hoogerheide
2nd Hofstade
2nd Hoogleide-Gits
2nd Milan
 1st Eernegem
 1st Roubaix
 Superprestige
2nd Hoogstraten
3rd Diegem
 2nd National Championships
 2nd Surhuisterveen
 2nd Woerden
 3rd Overall Gazet van Antwerpen
2nd Lille
3rd Oostmalle
 3rd Overijse
2006–2007
 1st  UCI World Championships
 UCI World Cup
1st Hofstade
3rd Aigle
3rd Kalmthout
3rd Tábor
3rd Treviso
3rd Hoogerheide
 1st Aalter
 2nd Overall Superprestige
2nd Gavere
3rd Hamme
3rd Vorselaar
 2nd Ardooie
 2nd Roubaix
 2nd Zonhoven
 Gazet van Antwerpen
3rd Loenhout
 3rd Erpe-Mere
 3rd Eernegem
 3rd Surhuisterveen
2007–2008
 1st Roubaix
 1st Southampton
 1st Woerden
 UCI World Cup
2nd Koksijde
3rd Hoogerheide
 2nd Zeddam
 3rd Erpe-Mere
 3rd Harderwijk
2008–2009
 UCI World Cup
1st Koksijde
1st Roubaix
3rd Igorre
 2nd Marle
 Superprestige
3rd Vorselaar
2009–2010
 1st Sun Prairie Day 2
 2nd Sun Prairie Day 1

1972 births
Living people
Belgian male cyclists
Cyclo-cross cyclists
People from Herentals
UCI Cyclo-cross World Champions (men)
Cyclists from Antwerp Province
Belgian cyclo-cross champions